The Indira Gandhi Award for National Integration is a prestigious award accorded by the Indian National Congress, after Indira Gandhi, a former Prime Minister of India. The award is given annually, starting from 1985, to distinguished persons/institutions for promoting national integration and understanding and fellowship amongst religious groups, communities, ethnic groups, cultures, languages and traditions of India and the strengthening, through thought and action of the nation's sense of solidarity. The Awardee is selected by an Advisory Committee of eminent persons representing art, science, culture, education, literature, religion, social work, journalism, law and public life. The Award carries an amount of 5 lakh rupees in cash and a citation. The Award is given on the Martyr's Day. The Award is given for services deserving of recognition in the year to which the Award relates and two years immediately preceding it.

Recipients
The Award has so far been given to Swami Ranganathananda (1987), Aruna Asaf Ali, The Bharat Scouts and Guides (1987), Rafique Alam  (1988)P. N. Haksar, M. S. Subbulakshmi (1990), Rajiv Gandhi (Posthumous), Paramdham Ashram (Wardha, Maharashtra), Acharya Tulsi (1993), Bishambhar Nath Pande (1996), Beant Singh (Posthumous) and Natwar Thakkar (jointly), Gandhi Institute of Public Affairs (Karnataka), Indira Gandhi Centre for National Integration (Shanti Niketan), A. P. J. Abdul Kalam, Shankar Dayal Sharma (Posthumous), Satish Dhawan, H. Y. Sharada Prasad, Ram-Rahim Nagar Slum Dwellers Association (Ahmedabad), Aaman Pathik Peace Volunteer Group (Ahmedabad), Ram Sinh Solanki and Sunil Tamaiche (jointly), the 2015-16 award was given to TM Krishna.
 2002: Acharya Mahaprajna
 2003: Shyam Benegal 
 2004: Mahashweta Devi 
 2005: Javed Akhtar
 2006: Dr. J. S. Bandukwalla and Ram Puniyani (jointly)
 2008: Kasturba Gandhi National Memorial Trust 
 2009: Balraj Puri
 2010: A. R. Rahman and Ramakrishna Mission Ashram (jointly)
 2011: Mohan Dharia
 2012: Gulzar
 2013: M. S. Swaminathan
 2014: Rajagopal P. V.
 2015: T. M. Krishna
 2016: T. M. Krishna
 2017: Chandi Prasad Bhatt
 2018: Chandi Prasad Bhatt
2019:Chandi prasad bhatt

References

Peace awards
Indian awards
Awards established in 1985
Monuments and memorials to Indira Gandhi
1985 establishments in India